Dokdo is the Korean name for the Liancourt Rocks.

Dokdo may also refer to:
 Dokdo (currency), the former currency of Kutch, India
 Dokdo class amphibious assault ship and its lead ship

See also
 Takeshima (disambiguation), Japanese name of the island